The 1946 season was the Hawthorn Football Club's 22nd season in the Victorian Football League and 45th overall.

Fixture

Premiership Season

Ladder

References

Hawthorn Football Club seasons